Dan Condurache (born 26 July 1952) is a Romanian film actor. He has appeared in more than fifty films since 1976.

Born in Dorohoi, he completed high school in his native city.

Selected filmography

References

External links
 

1952 births
Living people
People from Dorohoi
Romanian male film actors
Caragiale National University of Theatre and Film alumni